I Know How To Play 'Em! is the one and only album by American hip hop recording artists Eric 'Original E' Woods and DJ Big Boss, released as a duo O.G. Style from Houston, Texas. It was peaked at #69 on Billboard Top R&B/Hip-Hop Albums.

Background and production 

O.G. Style's debut album I Know How To Play 'Em! was one of the Rap-A-Lot Records earliest full-lengths, which was dropped in 1991. It featured the single "Catch 'Em Slippin'", released in 1990.

Tony 'Big Chief' Randle and James Smith from American management company Jas Management, along with Rap-a-Lot's engineer Cliff Blodget served as executive producers and managers of the project. Audio production of the entire record was handled by DJ Big Boss and all the tracks were written and performed by Eric Woods.

Track listing

Samples
"Intro" sampled "Funky Drummer" by James Brown (1970) and "Funk You Up" by The Sequence (1979)
"Funky Payback" sampled "Mary Jane" by Rick James (1978)
"Catch 'Em Slippin" sampled "Soulful Strut" by Young-Holt Unlimited (1968) and "Synthetic Substitution" by Melvin Bliss (1973)
"This Is How It Should Be Done" sampled "I Know You Got Soul" by Eric B. & Rakim (1987)
"10 B 3" sampled "UFO" by ESG (1981) and "Weak At The Knees" by Steve Arrington (1983)
"Kick The Ballistics" sampled "Funky Drummer" by James Brown (1970) and "Kool Is Back" by Funk, Inc. (1971)
"The 'E'" sampled "Pass The Peas" by The J.B.'s (1972)
"Ain't We Funky" sampled "Just Kissed My Baby" by The Meters (1974)

Personnel
 Cliff Blodget - executive producer
 Tony Randle - management
 James H. Smith - executive producer, management
 Eric Woods - main artist, rap vocals
 Big Boss - main artist, producer

References

1991 albums
O.G. Style albums
Rap-A-Lot Records albums